A BK-tree is a metric tree suggested by Walter Austin Burkhard and Robert M. Keller specifically adapted to discrete metric spaces.
For simplicity, consider integer discrete metric . Then, BK-tree is defined in the following way. An arbitrary element a is selected as root node.  The root node may have zero or more subtrees.  The k-th subtree is recursively built of all elements b such that . BK-trees can be used for approximate string matching in a dictionary.

Example

This picture depicts the BK-tree for the set  of words {"book", "books", "cake", "boo", "boon", "cook", "cake", "cape", "cart"} obtained by using the Levenshtein distance

The BK-tree is built so that:
 for all node  of the BK-tree, the weight assigned to its egress arcs are distinct;
 Example 1: Consider the arc from "book" to "books". The distance between "book" and any word in {"books", "boo", "boon", "cook"} is equal to 1;
 Example 2: Consider the arc from "books" to "boo".  The distance between "books" and any word in {"boo", "boon", "cook"} is equal to 2.

Insertion 

The insertion primitive is used to populate a BK-tree  according to a discrete metric .

Input:
 : the BK-tree;
  denotes the weight assigned to an arc ;
  denotes word assigned to a node );
 : the element to be inserted into ;

Output:
 The node of  corresponding to 

Algorithm:
 Create a root node  in 
 
 Return 
 Set  to the root of 
 While  exists:
 
 If :
 Return 
 Find  the child of  such that 
 If  is not found:
 Create the node 
 
 Create the arc 
 
 Return

Lookup 

Input:
 : the BK-tree;
 : the corresponding discrete metric (e.g. the Levenshtein distance);
 : the searched element;

Output:

Algorithm:
 If  is empty:
 Return 
 Create  a set of nodes to process, and insert the root of  into .
 
 While :
 Pop an arbitrary node  from 
 
 If :
 
 For each egress-arc :
 If : (cut-off criterion)
 Insert  into .
 Return

Example of the lookup algorithm 

Therefore, the subtree rooted at "cake" will be pruned from the search, as the word closest to "cool" cannot appear in that subtree. Therefore, it is safe to disregard the entire subtree rooted at "cake".

As ,  remains set at 2 and the single outgoing arc from the node containing "books" is considered. This again does not improve upon .

See also 

 Levenshtein distance – the distance metric commonly used when building a BK-tree
 Damerau–Levenshtein distance – a modified form of Levenshtein distance that allows transpositions

References 
  W. Burkhard and R. Keller. Some approaches to best-match file searching, CACM, 1973
  R. Baeza-Yates, W. Cunto, U. Manber, and S. Wu. Proximity matching using fixed queries trees. In M. Crochemore and D. Gusfield, editors, 5th Combinatorial   Pattern Matching, LNCS 807, pages 198–212, Asilomar, CA, June 1994.
   Ricardo Baeza-Yates and Gonzalo Navarro. Fast Approximate String Matching in a Dictionary. Proc. SPIRE'98

External links 
 A BK-tree implementation in Common Lisp with test results and performance graphs.
 An explanation of BK-Trees and their relationship to metric spaces 
 An explanation of BK-Trees with an implementation in C# 
 A BK-tree implementation in Lua 
 A BK-tree implementation in Python 

Trees (data structures)